Goudyloch Safford (née Erwin) "Giddy" Dyer (May 23, 1919 – February 28, 2008) was an American politician and librarian who served as a member of the Illinois House of Representatives.

Early life and education 
Born in Atlanta, Georgia, Dyer grew up in Davidson, North Carolina. She graduated from Agnes Scott College in 1938.

Career 
Dyer worked as a children's librarian in New York before marrying Robert C. Dyer. Dyer and her husband moved to Chicago and lived in Western Springs before settling in Hinsdale, Illinois, where she became involved with the Republican Party and served on the DuPage County, Illinois Board. From 1969 to 1981, Dyer served as a member of the Illinois House of Representatives. Dyer was one of 2,000 delegates to the 1981 White House Conference on Aging.

In the 2020 miniseries Mrs. America, Dyer was portrayed by Laura de Carteret.

Personal life 
Dyer died of heart failure at her home in Davidson, North Carolina.

References

1919 births
2008 deaths
Politicians from Atlanta
People from Hinsdale, Illinois
Agnes Scott College alumni
Women state legislators in Illinois
County board members in Illinois
Republican Party members of the Illinois House of Representatives
People from Davidson, North Carolina
20th-century American politicians
20th-century American women politicians
21st-century American women